Lone Rhino is the debut solo album by American musician Adrian Belew, released on April 26, 1982. It features the musicians and much of the repertoire of Belew's pre- King Crimson band GaGa.

The album was recorded following years of Belew playing as lead guitarist for Frank Zappa, David Bowie, Talking Heads and Tom Tom Club, and seven months after his 1981 debut as the lead singer, lyricist, and second guitarist of King Crimson with Discipline. A video was produced for the track "Big Electric Cat", filmed in 1982 in New York City that opens with a shot of the World Trade Center. Belew's daughter Audie (four years old at the time) duets with her father on the last track, "The Final Rhino" (which was produced when Belew secretly recorded a piano piece improvised by Audie and then added a guitar line). She also coined the word "momur" which meant anything that frightened her (monster). The song "Animal Grace" was originally called "Buy That Face" and was written about David Bowie. Members of the Springfield, Illinois High School band were enlisted  to play the 7/8 coda on "Adidas in Heat".

Track listing

Personnel
 Adrian Belew – guitars, drums, percussion, lead vocals, electronics
GaGa
 Christy Bley – acoustic piano, backing vocals
 Bill Janssen – alto and baritone saxophone, backing vocals
 J. Clifton Mayhugh – fretted and fretless bass guitars, backing vocals
Additional musician
 Audie Belew  – acoustic piano on "The Final Rhino"
Technical
 Adrian Belew – producer
 Stan Hertzman – executive producer
 Gary "Plattski" Platt – engineer
 Rich Denhart – assistant engineer
 Benjamin Armbrister – recording
 Masayoshi Sukita – photography

References 

Adrian Belew albums
Island Records albums
1982 debut albums
Albums produced by Adrian Belew